is a 1990 Game Boy arcade racing video game that was released in North America and Japan.

Summary
Players must choose between a dune buggy, a sand rail vehicle, and the incredible off-road truck. All races are strictly against the clock while the driver navigates through blockades on the road and other drivers that want to defeat the player. All of the ten courses must be unlocked in a linear fashion; all the races take place in a tube. Few power-ups exist in the game, including a chance to increase the player's nitro boost.

There are ten stages in the entire game. No penalties are given for bumping into the other drivers; unlike real life. Each course is in the shape of a half-pipe.

References

1990 video games
Copya Systems games
Electro Brain games
Game Boy-only games
Racing video games
Video games developed in Japan
Game Boy games
Multiplayer and single-player video games